Thomas Morgan Rotch (1849–1914) was the president of the American Pediatric Society for 1890–91 and America's first full professor of pediatrics. He was the great-grandson of Samuel Powel Griffitts.

Biography 
Thomas Morgan Rotch was born in Philadelphia on December 9, 1849. He graduated from Harvard College in 1870, and from Harvard Medical School in 1874.

He died at his home in Boston on March 9, 1914.

References 

Presidents of the American Pediatric Society
American pediatricians
1849 births
1914 deaths
19th-century American physicians
20th-century American physicians
Harvard College alumni
Harvard Medical School alumni